Holland Bamboo is a settlement in Saint Elizabeth Parish in Jamaica.

References

Populated places in Saint Elizabeth Parish